Glory By Honor is a professional wrestling pay-per-view (PPV) event promoted by Ring of Honor (ROH). There have been 11 events in the Glory by Honor chronology, some of which occurred over two nights.

Since its inception in 2002, all events have been held in an indoor arena, except for Glory By Honor V, Night 1, which was held under a tent outside of the original venue. The show itself was threatened due to a problem with permits.  Each event featured wrestlers from ROH competing in various professional wrestling match types. Since the inaugural event, six championship matches have taken place in the main event.

Background
Glory By Honor features professional wrestling matches that involved different wrestlers from existing, scripted feuds and storylines with wrestlers portrayed as villains or heroes, or more ambiguous characters in scripted contests that build tension and culminate in a wrestling match on the pay per view.

In 2010, Ring of Honor's official website announced that ROH would have their next online pay per view event in New York, being the first time the Glory By Honor lineage would be featured in such a capacity. This is the fourth pay per view ROH had featured online.

Dates and venues

See also 
ROH's annual events

References

External links 
 Ring of Honor's official site

 
Recurring events established in 2002
Recurring events disestablished in 2016